This is a list of schools in Visalia, California.

Catholic
George McCann Memorial Catholic School

Christian (non-denominational)
Central Valley Christian Elementary School
Central Valley Christian High School
Grace Christian School
St. Paul's School
Visalia Christian Schools

Public schools

Elementary schools
Conyer Elementary School
Cottonwood Creek Elementary School
Crestwood Elementary School
Crowley Elementary School
Elbow Creek Elementary School
Fairview Elementary School
Four Creeks Elementary School
Golden Oak Elementary School
Goshen Elementary School
Highland Elementary School
Houston Elementary School
Hurley Elementary School
Ivanhoe Elementary School
Linwood Elementary School
Manuel F. Hernandez Elementary School 
Mineral King Elementary School
Mountain View Elementary School
Oak Grove Elementary School
Outside Creek Elementary School
Pinkham Elementary School 
River Bend Elementary School 
Riverway Elementary School 
Royal Oaks Elementary School
Union Elementary School
Veva Blunt Elementary School
Washington Elementary School
Willow Glen Elementary School

Middle schools
Green Acres Middle School
Divisadero Middle School
Valley Oak Middle School
La Joya Middle School

High schools
El Diamante
Golden West
La Sierra High School (public charter high school)
Mt. Whitney
Redwood
University Preparatory High School
Visalia Technical Early College High School

Alternative Schools
Visalia Charter Independent Study
Sequoia High School
Crescent Valley Public Charter II
Charter Alternatives Academy (Packwood)
Charter Home School Academy
Midcounty
Eleanor Roosevelt Community Learning Center
Sycamore Valley Academy
Valley Life Charter School

References

Visalia
Education in Visalia, California
Education in Tulare County, California